Arthur Octavius Kitson (19 April 1848, Leeds – 25 February 1915, Groombridge) was the British husband involved in the famous legal case Kitson v. Playfair. He is also known for his 1907 biography of Captain James Cook.

Familly background 
Arthur Octavius Kitson was the youngest of the four children born to the wealthy locomotive manufacturer James Kitson (1807–1885) and his wife Ann.  James Kitson (1835–1911) was the eldest son, John Hawthorn was the second son, and Emily was the only daughter. In 1864 she married the eminent physician William Smoult Playfair.

Linda Kitson 
Arthur Kitson left England to live in Australia, supported by an annual allowance from his family (see remittance man). There he married Linda Elizabeth Douglas Leroy on 4 August 1881 in Rockhampton. They had two children, Arthur James Douglas (b. 1882) and Irene Marion Douglas (b. 1884). In October 1892 Linda Kitson and her two children returned to England, while Arthur, apparently pursued by creditors, went to Port Darwin and then embarked on various trips in the Pacific.

Emily and William Playfair welcomed Linda Kitson and her children and persuaded James and John Hawthorn Kitson to make over to her the annual allowance that her husband, their younger brother, had continued to receive. This payment (possibly reduced from £500 to £400 per annum) became the sole support of Linda Kitson and her children because she received nothing from her husband.

Linda Kitson settled in Kensington and consulted Dr. R. Muzio Williams about a gynecological problem. He persuaded her to see Dr. Playfair for a consultation. She was attended by Dr. Playfair on 16 January 1894 and again on 24 February 1894, when she revealed to him that she had not menstruated since December 1893.

Both doctors began the operation in the belief that they were dealing with an intrauterine cancerous growth, but they seemed to discover that Linda Kitson had recently had either a natural miscarriage or an abortion — even though she was separated from her husband.

Dr. William Playfair communicated his suspicion to his wife and to her brothers Sir James and John Hawthorn. Furthermore, Playfair, on moral grounds, openly forbade her presence among female members of his family. Linda Kitson objected (probably falsely) that her husband had secretly visited her in London.

Sir James Kitson wrote to his sister-in-law that her annual allowance was ended and that she was excluded from the Kitson family, but if she returned to Australia he would provide a very small annual allowance. Linda Kitson was able to contact her husband by letter in June 1894; he was back in London by September 1894 and claimed (apparently falsely) that he had returned secretly to London in December 1893. This contretemps led to the famous case Kitson v. Playfair.

Kitson v. Playfair (1896)
In 1896 Linda Kitson brought a legal action against Dr. William Playfair for an alleged breach of professional confidence. Leading physicians spoke in court in support of Playfair's conduct but the judge found such conduct unacceptable, in accord with prevailing public opinion on medical confidentiality. The jury awarded record-breaking damages of £12,000 against Playfair. The amount was then reduced by legal agreement to £9,200 on application for a new trial. According to historian Angus McLaren, writing in 1993:

Biography of Captain Cook
Walter Besant's biography entitled Captain Cook (vi+191 p.) was published in 1890 by Macmillan in the series Men of Action. In 1907 Kitson's biography Captain James Cook, R.N., F.R.S., "the Circumnavigator" (xvi+525 p.) was published in London by John Murray and in New York by E. P. Dutton. Kitson's dedication "to my wife Linda Douglas Kitson" immediately precedes the preface of his book.

Kitson was given access by Joseph Chamberlain to some volumes of Colonial Records that were not yet available to the public and given information concerning a log of Captain Cook in the personal possession of Edward Ellis Morris. Kitson was also helped by Canon Frederick Bennett (1822–1903), whose mother was a cousin of Captain James Cook's wife Elizabeth.

References

External links
 

1848 births
1915 deaths
20th-century biographers
English biographers
People from Leeds
Legal cases
Medical controversies in the United Kingdom